The Mygale M21-F4 is an open-wheel formula race car, designed, developed and built by French manufacturer Mygale, for Formula 4 junior categories, since 2021.

References

Open wheel racing cars